Alyssa Mifsud (born 22 December 1994) is an Australian rules footballer who played for the Melbourne Football Club in the AFL Women's competition. She was drafted by Melbourne with their fifth selection and fortieth overall in the 2016 AFL Women's draft. She played every match in her debut season to finish with seven games, in addition to placing equal third in the league goalkicking with nine goals. Melbourne signed Mifsud for the 2018 season during the trade period in May 2017. She decided to step away from the club and pursue new ambitions by the end of 2018.

Mifsud now continues to play her footy in the Division 1 competition of the Northern Football Netball League with the VU Western Spurs where she began her career before playing in the AFLW competition. In 2019 she became a premiership player after a dominating performance against diamond creek. With an amazing season Mifsud has been selected as a Division 1 Allstar midfielder.

References

External links 

1994 births
Living people
Melbourne Football Club (AFLW) players
Australian rules footballers from Victoria (Australia)
Victorian Women's Football League players